Chamleh or Chamaleh may refer to:
 Chamleh, Razavi Khorasan
 Chamleh, Zanjan